Following is a list of all Article III United States federal judges appointed by President William Howard Taft during his presidency. In total Taft appointed 57 Article III federal judges, among them were: six justices to the Supreme Court of the United States, including the appointment of a sitting associate justice as chief justice, 13 judges to the United States Courts of Appeals, and 38 judges to the United States district courts. Taft also appointed judges to various specialty courts, including 5 appointees to the Article III United States Commerce Court, 6 appointees to the Article I United States Court of Customs Appeals and 1 appointee to the Article I tribunal Board of General Appraisers (later the United States Customs Court). The Commerce Court was abolished in 1913; Taft was thus the only president to appoint judges to that body.

From the establishment of the United States courts of appeals on June 16, 1891, until the abolition of the United States circuit courts on December 31, 1911, all United States Circuit Judges where jointly appointed to both the United States court of appeal and the United States circuit court for their respective circuit. Starting January 1, 1912, United States Circuit Judges served only on the United States court of appeal for their respective circuit.

United States Supreme Court justices

Courts of appeals and circuit courts
The United States circuit courts were abolished on January 1, 1912, the final day of service being December 31, 1911. Judges Frederic Dodge and John Bayard McPherson did not have any United States circuit court service, having taken office subsequent to abolition of the circuit courts.

District courts

Specialty courts

United States Commerce Court

United States Court of Customs Appeals

Board of General Appraisers

Notes

Renominations

References
General

 

Specific

Sources
 Federal Judicial Center

Taft

Presidency of William Howard Taft
William Howard Taft-related lists